Viviendo Deprisa ("Living in a Hurry") is the second studio album (first with WEA Latina) recorded by Spanish singer-songwriter Alejandro Sanz (although he previously had recorded Los Chulos Son Pa' Cuidarlos under the name Alejandro Magno in 1989). It was released by WEA Latina on 20 August 1991 (see 1991 in music). With this album he was announced to national level, all the tracks were composed by Sanz but were credited to A. Medina (Algazul Medina) pseudonymous that Sanz used initially in his career. The official singles of the album were "Los Dos Cogidos de la Mano" and "Pisando Fuerte", which were a boom in the musical Spanish panorama, other songs that received radio airplay were "Se Le Apagó la Luz" and "Lo Que Fui Es lo Que Soy". He shot videos for the songs "Los Dos Cogidos de la Mano" and "Pisando Fuerte".

Track listing 
 Los Dos Cogidos de la Mano – 5:06
 Pisando Fuerte – 4:32
 Lo Que Fui Es lo Que Soy – 4:40
 Todo Sigue Igual – 5:13
 Viviendo Deprisa – 3:18
 Se Le Apagó la Luz – 4:46
 Duelo al Amanecer – 3:31
 Completamente Loca – 3:32
 Toca Para Mí – 4:08
 Es Este Amor – 3:34

Re-release 

Viviendo Deprisa (Edición 2006) is the re-release of the album Viviendo Deprisa containing a CD and DVD. The CD contains 13 tracks and the DVD contains 6 videos.

Track listing

CD 
 Los Dos Cogidos de la Mano – 5:06
 Pisando Fuerte – 4:32
 Lo Que Fui Es lo Que Soy – 4:40
 Todo Sigue Igual – 5:13
 Viviendo Deprisa – 3:18
 Se Le Apagó la Luz – 4:46
 Duelo al Amanecer – 3:31
 Completamente Loca – 3:32
 Toca Para Mí – 4:08
 Es Este Amor – 3:34
 Toca Para Mí (Demo) – 4:02
 Viviendo Deprisa (Demo) – 3:10
 Se Le Apagó la Luz (Versión Básico) – 4:37

DVD 
 Los Dos Cogidos de la Mano (Video)
 Pisando Fuerte (Video)
 Lo Que Fui Es lo Que Soy (Concierto Pabellón de Deportes del Real Madrid)
 Los Dos Cogidos de la Mano (Concierto Pabellón de Deportes del Real Madrid)
 Se Le Apagó la Luz (Concierto Pabellón de Deportes del Real Madrid)
 Pisando Fuerte (Concierto Pabellón de Deportes del Real Madrid)

Album certifications

See also
List of best-selling albums in Spain
 List of best-selling Latin albums

References

1991 albums
Alejandro Sanz albums
Spanish-language albums
Warner Music Latina albums